Salvage Marines is an American Sci-Fi television series, created by Sean-Michael Argo, Rafael Jordan, and Jamie R. Thompson, based on the Necrospace novel series by Sean-Michael Argo, and starring Casper Van Dien. The show premiered on July 28, 2022 with all six episodes of the first season being available to watch on that date.

The North American distribution rights were acquired by Screen Media on June 7, 2022.

The series was first announced by SPI International on April 10, 2019 as one of four TV series they would be producing, in partnership with Philippe Martinez.

Premise 
The series is set in a dystopian future where society's downtrodden are offered a better future by serving in a platoon of deep space combat soldiers. Van Dien's character, Samuel Hyst, is a factory worker living on the planet Baen 6. He joins the military after learning his wife is pregnant and his societal debt would be passed on to his child.

Cast and characters 
 Casper Van Dien as Samuel Hyst
 Peter Shinkoda as Ben Takeda
 Armand Assante as Kelkis Morturi
 Jennifer Wenger as Jada Sek
 Kevin Porter as Boss Wynn Marsters
 Linara Washington as Sura Hyst
 Gianni Capaldi as Tyrol Gaius
 Shane Graham as Harold Marr

Episodes

Marketing 
The series conducted a panel at San Diego Comic-Con including stars Casper Van Dien, Peter Shinkoda, Jennifer Wenger, and Linara Washington.

Release 
The series was released on Popcornflix on July 28, 2022, and was later added to Crackle on September 1, 2022.

References

External links 
 
 
 
 External Website

American action adventure television series
2020s American science fiction television series
2022 American television series debuts
Television shows based on American novels
Television shows filmed in the United Kingdom